Claudia Shear (born September 12, 1962) is an American actress and playwright. She was nominated for the Tony Award, Best Play and Best Actress for her play Dirty Blonde.

Early life
Shear was born in Brooklyn, New York on September 12, 1962, to Julian "Bud" and Helaine Catoggio. Her mother was a glamorous executive in the cosmetic industry, a talented amateur painter and collector of antiques. Her father, who was a Deputy Chief in the New York City Fire Department at the time of her birth, left her mother and her older sister Diane, soon after she was born  She attended the City University of New York.

Career
Shear came to prominence with her self-penned solo performance piece Blown Sideways Through Life (described by Frank Rich as an "autobiographical monologue"). The show premiered at the New York Theatre Workshop in September 1993. The show then opened at the Off-Broadway Cherry Lane Theatre on January 7, 1994, closing on July 17, 1994, after 221 performances. Shear won an Obie Award, Special Citation and a 1994 Drama Desk Award nomination for Outstanding Solo Performance. Shear's employment experiences as a member of the American work force - sixty-four jobs in all, including pastry chef, nude model, waitress, whorehouse receptionist, proofreader, and Italian translator - provided her a wealth of material for her piece. She adapted it for a 1995 presentation on the PBS series American Playhouse.

Shear wrote the play Dirty Blonde, her exploration of the life and career of Mae West. The play premiered
Off-Broadway at the New York Theatre Workshop, running from January 10, 2000, to February 13, 2000 and then opened on Broadway at the Helen Hayes Theatre on April 14, 2000 (previews); both productions were directed by James Lapine. She earned Tony and Drama Desk Award nominations for both Best Play and Best Actress and won the Theatre World Award.

Shear's acting credits include the films It Could Happen to You (1994) and Living Out Loud (1998) and a guest appearance as "fake Monica" on the NBC sitcom Friends in 1995. She has also written for such publications as The New York Times, Vogue, and Travel & Leisure, among others.

Restoration, a new play written by her, premiered in June 2009 at La Jolla Playhouse in La Jolla, California, commissioned by La Jolla Playhouse Artistic Director Christopher Ashley after an idea by Shear. In Restoration, Shear plays "Giulia, a down-on-her-luck art restorer from Brooklyn who receives what could possibly be a career-reviving job of 'refreshing' Michelangelo’s David in time for its quincentennial celebration in Florence." Christopher Ashley, who staged the world premiere of Restoration at La Jolla Playhouse, directed the work for its New York debut. The play premiered Off-Broadway at the New York Theatre Workshop on April 30, 2010 (previews) and officially on May 19, 2010, through June 13, 2010.

Shear appeared in the Broadway play by Michele Lowe, The Smell of the Kill, which had a brief run of 40 performances in 2002.

Shear co-wrote the book for the new musical based on the book Tuck Everlasting, also titled Tuck Everlasting. The music and lyrics are written by Chris Miller and Nathan Tysen with direction by Casey Nicholaw. The musical premiered at the Alliance Theatre, Atlanta, from January 21, 2015, to February 22, 2015. The musical opened on Broadway in previews on March 31, 2016, and officially in April 2016.

In 2017 she starred in EVENING AT THE TALKHOUSE, written by Wallace Shawn, with Matthew Broderick at The New Group at the Signature Theatre in New York City.

Awards and nominations

References

External links 
 
 Claudia Shear at Internet Off-Broadway Database
 Salon.com interview
 BBC Radio 4 Woman's Hour interview

20th-century American dramatists and playwrights
American stage actresses
American film actresses
American television actresses
Actresses from New York City
Writers from Brooklyn
Living people
1962 births
American women dramatists and playwrights
20th-century American women writers
20th-century American actresses
21st-century American dramatists and playwrights
21st-century American actresses
21st-century American women writers
City University of New York alumni
Theatre World Award winners